Integromics is a global bioinformatics company headquartered in Granada, Spain, with a second office in Madrid, subsidiaries in the United States and United Kingdom, and distributors in 10 countries. Integromics  provides bioinformatics software for data management and data analysis in genomics and proteomics. The company provides a line of products that serve the gene expression, sequencing, and proteomics markets. Customers include genomic research centers, pharmaceutical companies, academic institutions, clinical research organizations, and biotechnology companies.

Integromics was acquired by PerkinElmer in 2017.

Partners
Integromics operates in the global life science market and has an established network of collaborations with international technology providers such as Applied Biosystems, Ingenuity, Spotfire, pharmaceutical companies, and academic institutions.
Integromics collaborates with scientific research institutions and companies. 
 RESOLVE. Resolve chronic inflammation and achieve healthy ageing by understanding non-regenerative repair
 LIPIDOMIC NET. Lipid droplets as dynamic organelles of the fat deposition and release: translational research towards human disease. It is managed within the EU FP7, in close collaboration with LIPID MAPS and Lipid Bank.
 PROACTIVE. High throughput proteomics systems for accelerated profiling of putative plasma biomarkers.
 ProteomeXchange. Coordination action to establish proteomics standards. Coordinated by the European Bioinformatics Institute
 IRIS. Integrated computational environment for high throughput RNA Interference Screening. Coordinated by Integromics.

Awards and recognition

	2007 - Frost & Sullivan Product Innovation of the Year Award
	2007 - Emprendedor XXI Innovation Award
	2010 - Accésit of Premio Sello Innovación Award
	2011 - "Best Trajectory of a Technology-Based Innovative Enterprise (EIBT) 2011" Award
	2012 - Award of the Tech Media Europe 2012 & ICT Finance MarketPlace

History
      2002 Integromics founded. Integromics was founded as a spin-off of the National Center for Biotechnology (CNB / CSIC) in Spain and the University of Malaga. Principal founder Dr Jose Maria Carazo was motivated by a clear market need to develop new computational methods for analyzing data, with the company's first product addressing the needs of the microarray data analysis market.
      2007 Integromics partners with Applied Biosystems 
      2007 Integromics Inc. Establishes US Office at Philadelphia Science Center 
      2008 Integromics partners with TIBCO Spotfire to develop Integromics Biomarker Discovery 
      2009 Integromics partners with Ingenuity to offer integration for Comprehensive Genomics Analysis 
      2009 Integromics forms part of the PROACTIVE consortium to develop a unique high throughput plasma biomarker research platform 
      2009 Integromics releases its first proteomics product
      2009 Integromics received a venture investment of 1M€ from I + D Unifondo.
      2010 Integromics and TATAA Biocenter collaborate to offer comprehensive qPCR data analysis 
      2010 Integromics releases its first Next Generation Sequencing Analysis product
      2010 Integromics´ publication in Nature describes new class of gene-termini-associated human RNAs suggests a novel RNA copying mechanism, achieved using Integromics SeqSolve™ Next Generation Sequencing software
      2011 Integromics and Ingenuity expand their co-operation with the integration of a fourth Integromics product to Ingenuity's IPA 
      2011 Integromics launches OmicsHub Proteomics 2.0., a data management and analysis tool for mass spectrometry laboratories and core facilities 
      2011 Integromics´publication in Mol Cell Proteomics describes Multiplexed homogeneous proximity ligation assays for high-throughput protein biomarker research in serological material.
      2011 Integromics´ publication in Cell describes novel polyadenylation genome-wide profiling, achieved using Integromics SeqSolve™ Next Generation Sequencing software
      2012 Integromics partners with FPGMX to develop low-cost methods for clinical genomics
      2012 Tibco Spotfire Certifies Integromics as its Sole Partner in the Fields of Genomics, Proteomics and Bioinformatics
      2012 Integromics Launches OmicsOffice Platform, a total solution that provides a streamlined and common analysis environment to analyse results from different genomics technologies and the analytical tools to compare and achieve a higher level of results using these combinations
      2013 Integromics Partners with PerkinElmer for the Exclusive Worldwide Distributorship of New OmicsOffice Genomics Software From Integromics
      2013 Integromics partners with the Celgene Institute for Translational Research Europe (CITRE) and the Centre of Studies and Technical Research (CEIT) to implement the SANSCRIPT project
      2013 Integromics Establishes a Key Collaboration with European HPC Experts to Develop New Big-data Computing Solutions for Genomics

Products and services

SeqSolve
SeqSolve  is software for the tertiary analysis of Next Generation Sequencing (NGS) data.

RealTime StatMiner
RealTime StatMiner  is a Step-by-Step Guide for RT-qPCR data analysis. RealTime StatMiner is available as a standalone  as well as a TIBCO Spotfire compatible application. Co-developed with Applied Biosystems.

Integromics Biomarker Discovery
Integromics Biomarker Discovery  (IBD) for microarray gene expression data analysis guides the user throughout a step-by-step workflow.

OmicsHub Proteomics
OmicsHub® Proteomics is a platform for the central management and analysis of data in proteomics labs.

See also
 List of bioinformatics companies
 Bioinformatics
 Computational Biology
 Microarray analysis
 DNA Microarray
 Pathway Analysis
 Proteomics
 Gene expression
 DNA sequencing

References

Bioinformatics software
Genomics companies
Research support companies
Privately held companies of Spain
Companies of Andalusia
Biotechnology companies established in 2002
2002 establishments in Spain
Biotechnology companies of Spain